is an arts complex comprising a theatre, cinema and rehearsal space owned and operated by publishing house Shogakukan in the Jinbōchō neighbourhood of Chiyoda, Tokyo. Nikken Sekkei were the architects.

See also

 Jimbōchō Station

References

External links
  Homepage

Theatres in Tokyo
Theatres completed in 2007
2007 establishments in Japan
Buildings and structures in Chiyoda, Tokyo